Ferenc Zenthe (born Ferenc Rameshofer; 20 April 1920 – 30 July 2006) was a Hungarian actor, honored with being chosen as an Actor of the Nation, the Kossuth Prize and the Meritorious Artist Award of Hungary. Best known from the historical series A Tenkes Kapitánya and pioneering soap opera Szomszédok, he was regarded as one of the great talents of his generation.

Life and career
Ferenc Zenthe was born on 20 April 1920 in Salgóbánya (now part of Salgótarján) as the only son of a 50-year-old mining engineer. He attended the Cistercian high school of Eger, then attended four semesters in the University of Economics in Budapest, which he left to join the Academy of Performing Arts in 1941, but ended his studies after one year because of World War II. He joined the National Theatre of Pécs in 1945, and after two seasons, the Kisfaludy Theatre of Győr (now the National Theatre of Győr). In 1949 he joined the Csokonai Theatre of Debrecen, and in 1952 the Madách Theatre of Budapest, where he stayed for the rest of his life.

Beloved by the audience from the start of his career, he received numerous film and television roles in the restarting Hungarian film industry. His first role was the one of army general Sándor Nagy in Föltámadott a Tenger, then the leading role of Rákóczi hadnagya. This followed a series of romantic/comedic roles: a Kétszer kettő néha 5, Mese a 12 találatról, Kölyök, Fapados szerelem. In 1963 he got the leading role of the first series produced by the Hungarian Television: A Tenkes kapitánya (The Captain of Tenkes). As the leery Máté Eke in one of the greatest success of early Hungarian television, Zenthe's fame grew potentially. He led the cast of the Oscar-nominated The Revolt of Job in 1983.
Beside movies and stage roles, he was mainly known from TV series like Tüskevár, Fekete Város, Bors, and particularly Szomszédok: from 1987, he formed the grumbling old taxi driver Uncle Taki in the first sitcom of the Hungarian Television, which achieved cult status in its 12-year run. Ferenc Zenthe also performed numerous voiceovers, and was the cast member of Europe's longest running radio play, Szabó család, for which he recorded scenes even from his deathbed
. Ferenc Zenthe died of pneumonia on 30 July 2006, and was buried in the Farkasréti Cemetery.

Awards
 1954, 1968 Jászai Mari Award
 1975 Merited Artist Award
 1984 Award of Film Critics
 1989 Distinguished Artist Award
 1992 Erzsébet Award
 1993 Award of the Hungarian Actor's Guild
 1995 Order of Merit of the Hungarian Republic, Officer's Cross
 1997 Kossuth Prize
 2000 Honorary citizenship in Siklós
 2003 Honorary citizenship in his hometown of Salgótarján
 2005 Hungarian Heritage Award
 2005 Actor of the Hungarian Nation

Filmography

 Rákóczi hadnagya (1953)
 Föltámadott a tenger (1953)
 Kétszer kettő néha 5 (1954)
 Gábor diák (1955)
 Mese a 12 találatról (1956)
 A nagyrozsdási eset (1957)
 Csendes otthon (1957)
 Szerelem csütörtök (1959)
 Kard és kocka (1959)
 Kölyök (1959)
 Fapados szerelem (1960)
 Az arc nélküli város (1960)
 Alázatosan jelentem! (1960)
 Felmegyek a miniszterhez (1961)
 Jó utat autóbusz! (1961)
 Különös tárgyalás (1961)
 Mindenki gyanús (1961)
 Angyalok földjén (1962)
 Meztelen diplomata (1963)
 Tücsök (1963)
 Hivatalos utazás (1963)
 Lajos király válik (1964)
 Játék a múzeumban (1965)
 Két találkozás (1965)
 Patyolat akció (1965)
 A férfi egészen más (1966)
 Énekesmadár (1967)
 Egri csillagok (1968)
 A beszélő köntös (1968)
 Szemüvegesek (1968)
 Legenda a páncélvonatról (1969)
 Az örökös (1969)
 Őrjárat az égen (1969)
 Végállomás, kiszállni! (1970)
 A gyilkos a házban van (1970)
 Márton bátyám (1970)
 Vargabetű (1970)
 Hahó Öcsi! (1970)
 Vidám elefántkór (1970)
 Tisztújítás (1970)
 Valaki a sötétből (1970)
 Játék olasz módra (1970)
 Barátság (1970)
 Jó estét nyár, jó estét szerelem! (1971)
 Fegyház a körúton (1971)
 Remetekan (1971)
 Öngyilkos (1971)
 Fuss, hogy utolérjenek (1972)
 Az ördög cimborája (1972)
 Romantika (1972)
 Illatos út a semmibe (1972)
 A vőlegény nyolckor érkezik (1972)
 Irgalom (1973)
 Egy szerelem három éjszakája (1973)
 A törökfejes kopja (1973)
 Egy srác fehér lovon (1973)
 Bekötött szemmel (1974)
 Csata a hóban (1975)
 A méla tempefői (1975)
 A tragédia próbája (1975)
 Beszterce ostroma (1976)
 Csaló az üveghegyen (1976)
 Robog az úthenger (1976)
 Utolsó a padban (1976)
 Sir John Falstaff (1977)
 Családi kör (1977)
 Mire megvénülünk (1978)
 A világ közepe (1979)
 Égigérő fű (1979)
 A világ közepe (1979)
 Petőfi (1980)
 A Pogány Madonna (1980)
 A névtelen vár (1981)
 Csak semmi pánik (1982)
 Különös házasság (1983)
 Jób lázadása (1983)
 Erdő (1984)
 Megfelelő ember kényes feladatra (1984)
 Leányvásár (1984)
 Utazás az öreg autóval (1985)
 A három nővér (1985)
 Az elvarázsolt dollár (1985)
 II. József (1985)
 A csodakarikás (1986)
 A fantasztikus nagynéni (1986)
 Gyökér és vadvirág (1987)
 Halál sekély vízben (1993)
 Európa messze van (1994)
 Komédiások (2000)
 Zsaruvér és Csigavér I.: A királyné nyakéke (2001)
 Csocsó, avagy éljen május elseje! (2001)
 Zsaruvér és Csigavér II.: Több tonna kámfor (2002)
 Magyar vándor (2004)

Television Series
 A Tenkes kapitánya (1963)
 Princ, a katona (1966)
 Oly korban éltünk (1966)
 Tüskevár (1967)
 Őrjárat az égen (1969)
 Bors (1968)
 Rózsa Sándor (1970)
 A fekete város (1971)
 Vivát, Benyovszky! (1975)
 Szomszédok (1987-1999)
 Kerek világ (1988)
 Komédiások (2000)
 Sobri (2003)

References

Further reading
  - Ferenc Zenthe in the Hungarian Theatrical Lexicon (György, Székely. Magyar Színházművészeti Lexikon''. Budapest: Akadémiai Kiadó, 1994. ), freely available on mek.oszk.hu

External links
 Ferenc Zenthe's profile on the website of the National Theatre of Hungary
 Ferenc Zenthe's profile on Port.hu
 

Hungarian male television actors
Hungarian male film actors
Hungarian male stage actors
1920 births
2006 deaths
Corvinus University of Budapest alumni
Deaths from pneumonia in Hungary
Burials at Farkasréti Cemetery
People from Nógrád County